Luke Newberry (born 19 February 1990) is an English actor. He is best known for his leading role in the drama television series In the Flesh (2013–2014), which earned him a British Academy Television Award nomination.

Early life
Newberry was born in Exeter, Devon. He has two older sisters. He attended Exeter College, where he studied filmmaking, fine art, and English literature, and played the lead role in a college production of Hamlet. Aged 18, he attended the prestigious Bristol Old Vic Theatre School to study acting, graduating in 2011.

Career
Newberry was first signed with an agent aged seven. At age 11, he played the role of Anthony in the film The Heart of Me. In 2010 Newberry was cast to play Teddy Lupin in Harry Potter and the Deathly Hallows – Part 2 but was cut from the final film. He has acted on stage, playing Haemon in Sophocles' Antigone at the National Theatre. In 2015, Newberry played the lead role of Gabe in Teddy Ferrara at the Donmar Warehouse.

In 2013 Newberry starred in the leading role of the BBC Three supernatural drama In the Flesh. He was nominated for the BAFTA Award for Best Actor for Series 1 in 2014, and Series 2 began airing on BBC Three in the same year. Newberry was also nominated for Best Actor at the RTS Awards 2014.

In 2013, Newberry was one of Screen International's Stars of Tomorrow. He starred in the film Dusty and Me.

Charity work
Newberry is a supporter of the HeForShe feminism campaign.

Filmography

Film

Television

Stage

Radio

Music videos

Awards and nominations

References

External links

Alumni of Bristol Old Vic Theatre School
1990 births
Living people
Actors from Exeter
English male child actors
English male television actors
English male film actors
English male stage actors
Male actors from Devon
National Youth Theatre members
Male feminists
British feminists